English Freakbeat, Volume 2 is a compilation album in the English Freakbeat series, featuring recordings that were released decades earlier, in the mid-1960s.

Release data
The album was released as an LP in 1989 by AIP Records (as #AIP-10047) and as a CD in 1996 (as #AIP-CD-1047).

Vinyl-Only tracks and CD bonus tracks
The English Freakbeat LPs and CDs have most tracks in common, although not always in the same order, and some of the LP tracks were not included on the CDs.  Also, the CD bonus tracks are not always at the end of the album.  Thus, for clarity, we have shown tracks for both editions of the album, with vinyl-only tracks and CD bonus tracks indicated.

Notes on the tracks
The following information is taken mostly from the CD liner notes.  Glenn Athens & the Trojans – the leader is also known as Glen Athens – were from Surrey and won the local Beat Trophy in 1964; they were named by Mirabel Magazine as the top "semi-pro" band for two straight years.  This track is taken from a 1965 EP on Spot Records.

The song by The Sessions was written by Miki Dallon (who was featured as a solo artist on English Freakbeat, Volume 1) and was evidently released only in America.

The original incarnation of Mickey Finn as Mickey Finn & the Blue Men  in 1964-65 (see English Freakbeat, Volume 4) included a young Jimmy Page.  Both sides of their final single are included, from late 1967.

The Kubas/the Koobas had early connections with the Beatles; they had not only  toured with the legendary band but were also managed by Brian Epstein.  Also, they made an appearance in the film Ferry Cross the Mersey.  These two previously un-reissued tracks are from the flip side of their first single as the Kubas and from a later release as the Koobas.

"Messin' with the Man" by the Beat Merchants is the "B" side of their first single; the "A" side is on English Freakbeat, Volume 1.  Their second single, "So Fine" was paired with a song by Freddie and the Dreamers in its American issue.

Reportedly, the Wolf Pack is actually the Animals recording under a pseudonym for a soundtrack album called The Dangerous Christmas of Red Riding Hood.  Released on ABC-Paramount Records, the song may only have been issued in the U.S.

Members of The Syndicats include Steve Howe – a future member of Tomorrow and then Yes – who was the lead guitarist for this track.  Their classic "Crawdaddy Simone" can be found on English Freakbeat, Volume 4.

At one time, the Soul Agents reputedly included John Anthony, who later managed Genesis and other bands.  They also served as the backing band for Rod Stewart for several years.  Also, three members of this band later joined the Loot, who are featured on English Freakbeat, Volume 1.  These two tracks are from their rare third single.

The history of the Irish band the Wheels – rivals of Van Morrison's early band Them – is recounted in the original liner notes of the landmark Nuggets: Original Artyfacts from the First Psychedelic Era, 1965-1968, but only in regard to their connections with the Shadows of Knight, who covered several of their songs.  "Don't You Know" is the "B" side of their version of Gloria – the band claimed that Morrison wrote it for them! – while "Road Block" is from the flip side of the second single.  Another song by the Wheels can be found on English Freakbeat, Volume 4.

The estimable Joe Meek produced both singles by the Blueberries; "Little Baby" is their first release.  Jimmy Page is rumored to have played on this session, but this is denied by the band; their own guitarist Mike Stubbs later joined the Syndicats.

The curious "7 Pounds of Potatoes" – which "come between me and my love", claim the lyrics – is a surprising number from the Dakotas.  Although best known for backing Billy J. Kramer (see English Freakbeat, Volume 5) on several more pop-oriented recordings in the British Invasion era, the Dakotas made several hit records in their own right, notably "Cruel Sea" from 1963, which was renamed "Cruel Surf" for its U.S. release and was later covered by the Ventures.

The Limeys released six typical Mersey-oriented singles over the 1964 to 1966 period; "Cara-Lin", originally recorded by the Strangeloves is from their final single.

The Lancasters is one of several English artists that were "discovered" by Kim Fowley in the 1963-1965 period.  This is yet another track in the English Freakbeat series that was released only in the U.S., in December 1964.  Among the bandmembers are Ritchie Blackmore, one of the co-founders of Deep Purple.  "Satan's Holiday" is actually the venerable "Hall of the Mountain King".

Track listing

LP

Side 1:

 Glen Athens & the Trojans: "Let Me Show You" — rel. 1965
 The Sessions: "Let Me In" — rel. 1965
 Mickey Finn: "Garden of My Mind" — rel. 1967
 The Kubas: "I Love Her"
 The Beat Merchants: "So Fine" — rel. 1965
 Wolfpack: "We're Gonna Howl"
 The Syndicats: "Howlin' for My Baby" (Howlin' Wolf)

Side 2:

 The Soul Agents: "Gospel Train"
 The Soul Agents: "Let's Make it Pretty Easy" (John Lee Hooker), vinyl-only track
 The Muleskinners: "Back Door Man" — rel. 1965
 The Wheels: "Don't You Know"
 The Blueberries: "Please Don't Let Me Know" — rel. 1966
 The Beat Merchants: "Messin' with the Man" — rel. 1964
 The Dakotas: "7 Pounds of Potatoes" — rel. 1967

CD
 Glenn Athens & the Trojans: "Let Me Show You" — rel. 1965
 The Sessions: "Let Me In" — rel. 1965
 Mickey Finn: "Garden of My Mind" — rel. 1967
 Mickey Finn: "Time to Start Loving You" — rel. 1967, CD bonus track
 The Kubas: "I Love Her"
 The Koobas: "Face", CD bonus track
 The Beat Merchants: "So Fine" — rel. 1965
 The Beat Merchants: "Messin' with the Man" — rel. 1964
 The Wolf Pack: "We're Gonna Howl"
 The Syndicats: "Howlin' for My Baby" (Howlin' Wolf)
 The Soul Agents: "Gospel Train"
 The Soul Agents: "I Just Wanna Make Love to You", CD bonus track
 The Muleskinners: "Back Door Man" (Howlin' Wolf) — rel. 1965
 The Muleskinners: "Missed Your Lovin'", CD bonus track
 The Wheels: "Don't You Know" — rel. 1965
 The Wheels: "Road Block" — rel. 1965
 The Blueberries: "Please Don't Let Me Know" — rel. 1966
 The Blueberries: "It's Gonna Work out Fine" — rel. 1966, CD bonus track
 The Blue Rondos: "Little Baby", CD bonus track
 The Dakotas: "7 Pounds of Potatoes" — rel. 1967
 The Limeys: "Cara-Lin" — rel. 1966, CD bonus track
 The Lancasters: "Earthshaker" — rel. 1964, CD bonus track
 The Lancasters: "Satan's Holiday" — rel. 1964, CD bonus track

1989 compilation albums
Compilation albums by British artists
Pop rock compilation albums
Psychedelic rock compilation albums